Dice Game is a collaborative studio album by Detroit-based producer Apollo Brown and rapper Guilty Simpson. It was released online independently under hip hop label Mello Music Group on November 6, 2012 in digital format, and physical copies were made available on November 13, 2012. Recording sessions for Dice Game took place at LabCabInRoyalOak in Royal Oak, Michigan by Tate McBroom. The album was mixed at The Disc by Magnetic, and was mastered at Studio A by Eric Morgeson in 2012. The record was entirely produced and arranged by Apollo Brown, and features guest appearances from Torae and Planet Asia. The album was preceded by Apollo Brown & O.C.'s Trophies (2012).

Critical reception

Dice Game was met with critical acclaim from music critics. Jake Paine of HipHopDX gave the album a four out of five, saying: "Like its title and theme, Dice Game lives in the alley beside the club. It's for those in the know, and want an album that sounds great on the go. Guilty Simpson doesn't attempt any lyrical acrobatics, but rather pulls up a chair with a drink, and tells stories about his life, about his city and about the things he likes. It's simple, but it's highly effective. For the second time this year, Apollo Brown teams up with a veteran emcee associated with great production, and he thrives." Francisco McCurry of Potholes In My Blog gave the album a 4.5 out of five, saying: "Dice Game is about describing rap as a life choice: an unforgiving game of chance that reaps powerful spiritual benefits and insights, but leaves one stressed and weary. Therefore, with Guilty and Apollo fully understanding their strengths as rapper and producer, the songs on the album have an empowered quality. Sure at times the album's tone seems to monotonously bleed from one song to the next and Guilty is not everybody's cup of tea stylistically or technically, but that doesn't derail the album’s forceful momentum."

Regan Flynn of iHipHop gave the album a five out of five, saying: "Presence of the tambourine, flute, organ, violin, cello, piano, and throwback samples like the Temptations' 'Let Your Hair Down' indicate this album is as underground as they come. They just don't make [them] like this much anymore, because most of today's artists follow a very specific and disappointing formula that is a complete departure from what hip-hop used to be – music for and from the heart of the street. After a hiatus a few years ago, Apollo decided to rededicate himself to producing music, and aspired to become a household name in the realm of hip-hop. I'm not sure if that dream will come true, but teaming up with Simpson, who 'wants to make the consumer care about the music again,' is definitely a win for them as well as us." Patrick Taylor of RapReviews gave the album an eight out of ten, saying: "Kendrick Lamar attempted to reinvent gangsta rap on his excellent good kid, m.A.A.d. city. This ain't that kind of album. Instead, Apollo Brown and Guilty Simpson refine and perfect gangsta rap on [Dice Game]. There is a self-awareness and sense of consequences that is missing from an artist like Chief Keef, and the beats show a craftmanship that you don't get from your average street rap mixtape. This is grown man gangsta music, beautifully executed."

Track listing

Personnel
Credits for Dice Game adapted from AllMusic, and the album liner notes.
 Apollo Brown — primary artist, arranger, producer
 Byron "Guilty Simpson" Simpson — primary artist, vocals
 Torae "Torae" Carr — featured artist
 Jason "Planet Asia" Green — featured artist
 Magnetic — mixing
 Tate McBroom — engineer
 Eric Morgeson — mastering
 Michael Tolle — executive producer

Charts

Release history
Physical releases

References

External links

2012 albums
Collaborative albums
Hip hop albums by American artists
Guilty Simpson albums
Mello Music Group albums
Albums produced by Apollo Brown